K-51 Verkhoturye is the lead submarine of the Project 667BDRM Delfin class (NATO reporting name: Delta IV) nuclear-powered ballistic missile submarines currently in service with the Russian Navy. It was built at the Sevmash shipbuilding company in Severodvinsk between 1981 and 1984 and was commissioned in 1984. It is named after the city of Verkhoturye.

Description 
It carries a complement of 135–140 sailors.

Two VM-4  pressurized water reactors power the submarine, and drive two shafts with seven-bladed fixed-pitch propellers. They propel the submarine to the maximum speed of  when surfaced and  when submerged.

It also has four 533 mm bow tubes which can launch RPK-7 Veter anti-ship cruise missiles, and up to 12-18 torpedoes or 24 mines.

Construction and service 
Verkhoturye is the first submarine of the Delta-IV class. It was built at the Sevmash shipbuilding yard and launched under the name Imeni XXVI Siezda KPSS ("named after the 26th Congress of the CPSU") and was renamed as Verkhoturye in February 1999. The boat's keel was laid on 23 February 1981, it was launched on 7 March 1984 and was commissioned on 28 December 1984 into the Soviet Navy. The submarine was the test bed for the R-29RM submarine launched ballistic missile during 1985–1986. Between 2–29 September, it became the first submarine of the class to cruise to the Arctic Ocean while carrying missiles. After the Soviet Union's dissolution in 1991, the boat was transferred to the Russian Navy.

It underwent modernization twice, first in 1999, and then between 2010 and 2012. It re-entered service in December 2012 after the re-fit.

References 

Ships built in the Soviet Union
Delta-class submarines
Cold War submarines of the Soviet Union
Submarines of Russia
Ships of the Russian Northern Fleet
Ships built by Sevmash